Elias George Conklin (16 August 1845 – 20 April 1901) was a member of the Legislative Assembly of Manitoba and the fifth Mayor of Winnipeg.

Conklin was born in 1845 near what is today Paris, Ontario. During his private career, he was a partner in the real estate firm Conklin and Fortune and was also involved in construction and grist mill ventures.

Towards the end of 1880, after Conklin had been a city alderman for some time, he defeated William Gomez Fonseca in the Winnipeg mayoral election. Conklin served as Mayor in 1881, then left that office after serving only one year.

In 1883, he was elected for the Winnipeg North provincial riding. Conklin served one term there until his defeat in the 1886 provincial election.

References

1845 births
1901 deaths
Manitoba Liberal Party MLAs
Mayors of Winnipeg
People from the County of Brant